Abdul Muḥsin Al-Saadoun, KCMG (1879 – 13 November 1929) was an Iraqi politician who served as the prime minister of Iraq on four occasions between 1922 and 1929.

Origins Prior to the Monarchy
Abdul Muhsin Al-Sadoun hailed from a family descended from the most powerful tribe within the Muntafiq Confederation (the Sa'duns). In the mid-nineteenth century the Ottoman rulers fostered rivalries between the dominant Sa'dun chiefs by offering enticing land deals to the highest bidders among them, pursuant to a policy of tribal weakening and division. In 1871 Midhat Pasha finally split the chiefs in two between "Ottomanizers" and their opponents by offering some chiefs permanent ownership of once communal tribal lands (previously they could only exact tribute from cultivators). The tribal chiefs then grew very wealthy by converting the rest of the tribe into their tenants for their exploitation.

Great Britain took Iraq from the Ottomans following World War I, and pursued a policy whereby they lavished political and economic favours on tribal leaders in order to encourage them to exert their influence in ways conducive to British economic designs in the country. as-Sa'dun was one of many to consistently obtain seats in Parliament in exchange for this service. Notably, however, while many tribal leaders at the time were provincial in outlook, as-Sa'dun was distinguished by being a sayyid (is a descent from the Prophet Muhammad), and by having broadened his horizons at the Military Academy in Istanbul. As-Sa'dun served as a military officer during Ottoman control of the country, as an aide-de-camp to Sultan Abd-ul-Hamid II, and as a ten-year member of the Ottoman Parliament. Afterward he returned to Iraq and embarked on a career in politics as a formidable politician.

Time in Parliament

As-Sa'dun was a shrewd politician with many tribal and British connections (as demonstrated by his control of the Parliament alliance known as the Progressives). This made him one of Faisal I of Iraq's bitterest rivals, as he frequently acted as an instrument of British supremacy over the Iraqi interests Faisal was trying to pursue. As premier in 1923 he cracked down on a movement calling for a boycott of elections for the Constituent Assembly. He was president of the Constituent Assembly in 1924. Then in 1926 he assured the smooth passage of the Second Ango-Iraqi Treaty despite its inclusion of an unequal twenty-five year Financial and Military Agreement between Iraq and Britain.

He was elected as the president of the Chamber of Deputies from 1926 to 1928 and in 1929.

During this, his third term as prime minister, as-Sa'dun also negotiated the Turkey-Iraqi Treaty in which Iraq promised to pay Turkey 10 percent of its revenues from the Mosul oil fields in return for Turkish recognition of Iraqi control of the area.  In this way he contributed immensely to Iraq's diplomatic efforts. Nonetheless, by December 1928 popular protest over British domination of Iraq had become so fervid (or, perhaps, as-Sa'dun had taken issue with Britain's refusal to grant Iraq control of its armed forces) that he began to support Faisal I in demanding more autonomy. He resigned in protest in January 1929.

Death
During his fourth term in office, as-Sa'dun died. He died of a self-inflicted wound from a gunshot on 13 November 1929.  His actions were considered to be consequence of the criticism he had received from the Iraqi population and, subsequently, the British and international community for his "disloyalty". He left behind a suicide note to his son stating "I have suffered with forbearance all possible insults and contempt".

References

1879 births
1929 deaths
Honorary Knights Commander of the Order of St Michael and St George
Prime Ministers of Iraq
Presidents of the Chamber of Deputies of Iraq
Finance ministers of Iraq
Place of birth unknown
Place of death missing
Heads of state who committed suicide
Suicides by firearm in Iraq